"Mi Cama" (Spanish for "My Bed") is a song by Colombian singer-songwriter Karol G. It was written by Karol G, Andy Clay, Antonio Rayo, Omar Sabino and Rene Cano, and produced by Clay and Rayo. The song was released on May 11, 2018 through Universal Music Latino, as the second single from her second studio album Ocean.

Background 

The song was first teased days prior to its official release through Karol G’s social media accounts, including snippets of the song and lyrics in captions. On May 9, 2018 the song had its official announcement, and the cover was released the following day. The song was released on May 11, 2018. A remix featuring Colombian singer J Balvin and American singer Nicky Jam was released on July 13, 2018.

Critical reception 

Billboard stated: "The song became one of the biggest hits of the summer thanks to its catchy, sheets-shaking melody. Unapologetically sexy and insistent about women reigning in bed."

Commercial performance 

"Mi Cama" debuted at number 45 on the US Billboard Hot Latin Songs chart dated June 2, 2018. On it’s fifth and sixth week, the song maintained a new peak of number 17. Following the release "Mi Cama (Remix)" featuring J Balvin and Nicky Jam, the song reached a new peak on its seventh week chart dated July 21, 2018. On its twelve week, "Mi Cama" reaches its final peak of number 6 for two consecutive weeks on the chart dated August 25, 2018, becoming Karol G’s highest peaking song on the chart at that time. The song received a Latin diamond certification by the Recording Industry Association of America (RIAA) on April 15, 2019, for sales of 600,000 equivalent-units.

Awards and nominations

Music video 

The music video for "Mi Cama" was directed by JP Valencia and was released on Karol G’s YouTube channel on May 11, 2018. As of January 2023, it has over 770 million views and 3.7 million likes.

The music video for its remix featuring J Balvin and Nicky Jam was directed by Mike Ho and was released on August 9, 2018. As of January 2023, it has over 240 million views and 1.2 million likes.

Charts

Weekly charts

Year-end charts

Certifications

References

2018 songs
2018 singles
Karol G songs
Spanish-language songs